The Peer Sessions is the fifty-fourth studio album by American recording artist Merle Haggard released on the Audium label in 2002.

Background
The old pop and country standards recorded for this collection were taken from the Ralph S. Peer publishing catalogue. They were recorded between 1996 and 1998 when Haggard was still with Curb Records. Fellow Country Music Hall of Fame member Roy Horton worked with Haggard in selecting the tunes, and the pair came up with 12 songs from the pens of Jimmie Rodgers, Jimmie Davis, Floyd Tillman, and Tommy Duncan, among others.

Reception

Zac Johnson of AllMusic wrote: "Overall, The Peer Sessions work both as an interesting collection of classic country songs and a solid individual work."

Track listing
"Peach Picking Time in Georgia" (Jimmie Rodgers, Clayton McMichen) – 3:51
"If It's Wrong to Love You" (Bonnie Dodd, Charles Mitchell) – 3:14
"Sweethearts or Strangers" (Jimmie Davis, Lou Wayne) – 2:52
"Put Me in Your Pocket" (W. Lee O'Daniel) – 3:51
"Anniversary Blue Yodel" (Jimmie Rodgers, Doc Watson) – 3:53
"Shackles and Chains" (Jimmie Davis) – 2:25
"Miss the Mississippi and You" (Jimmie Rodgers, Bill Halley) – 3:01
"It Makes No Difference Now" (Jimmie Davis, Floyd Tillman) – 4:03
"Whippin' That Old T.B." (Jimmie Rodgers) – 3:13
"Hang on to the Memories" (Jimmie Davis) – 3:06
"I Love You So Much it Hurts" (Floyd Tillman) – 3:25
"Time Changes Everything" (Bob Wills, Tommy Duncan) – 3:20

Personnel
Merle Haggard – vocals, guitar
Norm Hamlet – dobro, pedal steel guitar
Biff Adams – drums
Don Markham – saxophone, trumpet
Owen Bradley – piano
Eddie Curtis – bass
The Anita Kerr Singers – background vocals
Abe Manuel, Jr. – guitar, accordion, fiddle, harmonica, vocal harmony
Joe Manuel – bass, guitar
Grady Martin – guitar
Randy Mason – guitar
Redd Volkaert – guitar
Pete Wade – guitar
Hal Rugg – pedal steel guitar
Oleg Schramm – piano
Buddy Spicher – fiddle

References

2002 albums
Merle Haggard albums